Mauno Maisala (26 August 1933–27 December 2009) is a Finnish rower. He competed in the men's coxed four event at the 1964 Summer Olympics.

References

1933 births
2009 deaths
Finnish male rowers
Olympic rowers of Finland
Rowers at the 1964 Summer Olympics
People from Primorsk, Leningrad Oblast